Bad Soden (also: Bad Soden am Taunus) is a town and spa in the Main-Taunus-Kreis, Hessen, Germany. It had a population of 22,563 , up from 21,412 in 2005.

Information 
Bad Soden is a residential town for commuters working in Frankfurt am Main and other surrounding cities. It is known for its various springs, which contain carbonic acid gas and various iron oxides. The waters are used both internally and externally, and are widely exported. Soden lozenges, condensed from the waters, are also in great demand. Bad Soden has a well-appointed Kurhaus, an Evangelical and a Roman Catholic church, and a hospital. It also has a residential building by the architect Friedensreich Hundertwasser. Bad Soden has two Districts: Altenhein am Taunus and Neuenhein am Taunus.

Mayors
Mayors from 1893:

 1893–1912: Georg Busz
 1912–1920: Friedrich Höh
 1920–1923: Niederschulte
 1925–1937: Alfred Benninghoven
 1937–1939: Jakob Rittgen
 1939–1945: Karl Bohle
 1945–1948: Kuno Mayer
 1948–1957: Gilbert Just
 1957–1967: August Karl Wallis
 1967–1973: Helmuth Schwinge
 1973–1977: Hans-Helmut Kämmerer
 1977–1985: Volker Hodann
 1985–1986: Hans Jörg Röhrich (official by the government)
 1986–1992: Berthold R. Gall
 1992–2004: Kurt E. Bender
 2004–2018: Norbert Altenkamp
 2018–present: Frank Blasch

Notable people

 Elvira Bach (born 1951), artist and painter, she was born in Neuenhain (Taunus) and lives in Berlin since 1970
 Otto Frank (1889–1980), father of Anne Frank, worked in Bad Soden before moving to the Netherlands with his family
 Peter Lang (1878–1954), member of the parliament of the People's State of Hesse in the Weimar Republic
 Christian Seybold (1695–1768), artist of the era of Baroque; was baptized in Neuenhain (Taunus), lived until 1715 in Soden
 Georg Thilenius (1868–1937), ethnologist and anthropologist
 Sabine Winter (born 1992), table tennis player, was born in Bad Soden
 Edward Wunderly, physician and Milwaukee, Wisconsin politician, was from Bad Soden

Twin towns – sister cities

Bad Soden is twinned with:
 Rueil-Malmaison, France (1975)
 Kitzbühel, Austria (1984)
 Františkovy Lázně, Czech Republic (1992)
 Yōrō, Japan (2004)
 Franklin, United States (2016)

Gallery

References in Literature
In Leo Tolstoy's Anna Karenina, the Scherbatskys retire to Bad Soden to cure Kitty's illness.

In Ivan Turgenev's "Spring Torrents," Dimitry Sanin takes a trip with his future lover, Gemma, and her current fiancé to Soden, "a small town about half an hour's distance from Frankfurt".

Featured heavily in Part 3 of Thomas Pynchon's Gravity's Rainbow.

See also
Woco Group

References

External links 
 Internetauftritt der Stadt Bad Soden am Taunus
 
 

Main-Taunus-Kreis
Imperial Villages
Spa towns in Germany